Michael Jernberg (born January 6, 1963) is a former rallycross driver from Kinna, Sweden.

Career
Jernberg made his debut in the European Rallycross Championship (ERX) in 1991, driving an ex-Stig Blomqvist Ford Sierra RS 500 Cosworth in Division 1, finishing fifth overall. He improved to third overall in 1992, winning the last round at Estering, Germany. In 1993 he switched to the more prestigious Division 2, driving a Ford Escort RS Cosworth, finishing eleventh in his first season. Over the next sixteen years he challenged for the title, but the closest him came was second overall in 2004, 2005 and 2009. He ended his long association with Ford after the 2007 ERX season and used cars from Škoda until his retirement.

Despite the lack of title success in Europe, he managed to win the Swedish Rallycross Championship in 1995, 1998 and 2001.

He took part in the inaugural season of the Global RallyCross Championship (GRC) in 2011, finishing fourth overall in the AWD class.

Retirement
He retired after the 2011 GRC season and in 2014 he became team principal of Larsson Jernberg Motorsport (LJM). LJM currently runs an Audi A1 for Robin Larsson in the FIA World Rallycross Championship.

Racing record

Complete European Rallycross Championship results

Division 1

Division 2

Division 1*

* Division 2 was rebranded as Division 1 in 1997.

Complete Global RallyCross Championship results
Super AWD

PublicationsMichael Jernberg – Jakten på EM-guldet'', by Michael Jernberg & Morgan Björk, 176 pages, Swedish language,

References

External  links

Larsson Jernberg Motorsport Official website

1963 births
Living people
Swedish racing drivers
People from Västergötland
European Rallycross Championship drivers